Bowlus is a city in Morrison County, Minnesota, United States. The population was 279 at the 2020 census.

History
Many of the early settlers in the Bowlus area came from Silesia in Poland. Bowlus was platted in 1907 and named by officers of the Minneapolis, St. Paul and Sault Ste. Marie Railroad. A post office has been in operation since 1907. Bowlus was incorporated as a village in September 1908 and separated from the Two Rivers Township in February 1919.

Heavy stands of oak, maple, elm and white pine trees made lumbering a significant economic force in Bowlus's early history, including a sawmill, lumberyard, and barrel factory. The Bowlus Brick & Tile Co. was organized to extract the laminated clay the Two River deposited in the area.

Geography

Morrison County Roads 24 and 26; State Highway 238; and Main Street are four of the community's main routes.

Bowlus has a fire department, a medical squad, two cafes, a bar, a church, and two gasoline stations.

Demographics

2010 census
At the 2010 census there were 290 people, 114 households and 79 families residing in Bowlus. The racial make-up was 98.3% White, 0.3% African American, 0.3% Native American, and 1.0% from two or more races.

There were 114 households, of which 33.3% had children under the age of 18 living with them, 52.6% were married couples living together, 10.5% had a female householder with no husband present, 6.1% had a male householder with no wife present, and 30.7% were non-families. 21.9% of all households were made up of individuals, and 8.7% had someone living alone who was 65 years of age or older. The average household size was 2.54 and the average family size was 2.89.

The median age was 33 years. 24.1% of residents were under the age of 18, 9% were between the ages of 18 and 24, 29.3% were from 25 to 44, 22.1% were from 45 to 64 and 15.5% were 65 years of age or older. The sexual makeup was 55.2% male and 44.8% female.

2000 census
At the 2000 census, there were 260 people, 105 households and 74 families residing in Bowlus. The racial make-up was 100.00% White.

There were 105 households, of which 29.5% had children under the age of 18 living with them, 60.0% were married couples living together, 4.8% had a female householder with no husband present, and 28.6% were non-families. 25.7% of all households were made up of individuals and 13.3% had someone living alone who was 65 years of age or older. The average household size was 2.48 and the average family size was 2.96.

25.0% of the population were under the age of 18, 10.0% from 18 to 24, 28.8% from 25 to 44, 21.2% from 45 to 64 and 15.0% who were 65 years of age or older. The median age was 35 years. For every 100 females, there were 111.4 males. For every 100 females age 18 and over, there were 105.3 males.

The median household income was $32,222 and the median family income was $41,563. Males had a median income of $25,104 and females $24,063. The per capita income was $13,868. About 6.2% of families and 10.3% of the population were below the poverty line, including none of those under the age of eighteen and 46.0% of those 65 or over.

References

External links
 Walking tour of Bowlus from the Morrison County Historical Society

Cities in Minnesota
Cities in Morrison County, Minnesota
Polish-American culture in Minnesota